Amy Watt (born 16 December 1997) is a Canadian-American Paralympic athlete who mainly competes in the long jump in international level events.  She was born missing her left arm just below the elbow due to amniotic band syndrome. She competed for the United States at the 2016 Paralympic Games in Rio de Janeiro. She competed in the 2020 Summer Paralympics in Long jump T47 for Canada, placing fifth. Watt decided to retire from international Paralympic competitions after Tokyo 2020.

Career 
Watt holds United States and Canadian dual citizenship. She was born and raised in Palo Alto, California; and her father Jeff Watt is from Canada. She competed at the 2015 Parapan American Games in Toronto, 2015 IPC World Championships in Doha, Qatar, and 2016 Summer Paralympics in Rio de Janeiro for the United States.

She competed at the 2019 Parapan American Games in Lima, Peru and 2019 IPC World Championships in Dubai for Canada.

Watt's first foray into elite paralympics competitions was at the 2015 US Paralympics Track and Field National Championships, where she placed first in long jump and 400m, second in 100m and 200m.

Watt attended Pomona College in Claremont, California. She took a couple of years break from international competitions to focus on her education before switching to compete for Canada in 2019. She graduated cum laude with a double major in math and molecular biology and a minor in computer science in 2020. She has since embarked on her professional career as a data scientist.

References

External links 
 
 
 

1997 births
Living people
Paralympic track and field athletes of Canada
Canadian female long jumpers
Athletes (track and field) at the 2020 Summer Paralympics
Pomona College alumni
American people of Canadian descent
Data scientists
Women data scientists
Sportspeople from Palo Alto, California
Track and field athletes from California
College women's track and field athletes in the United States